The 1994-95 Nationalliga B season was the 48th season of the Nationalliga B, the second tier level of ice hockey in Switzerland. 10 teams participated in the league, and Lausanne HC won the championship and were promoted to Nationalliga A.

Regular season

Playoffs

Relegation 
 HC Martigny - HC Ajoie 4:3 on series

HC Ajoie is relegated.

External links
 Championnat de Suisse 1993/94 
 EliteProspects.com

1994–95 in Swiss ice hockey
Swiss